Ezekiel Francis (born 23 May 1985) is a Dominican cricketer who has represented the Windward Islands in West Indian domestic cricket. He plays as a left-handed middle-order batsman.

Francis made his first-class debut for the Windwards in March 2005, aged 19, playing against Guyana in the 2004–05 Carib Beer Cup. In 2006, he represented the Dominican national team in the Stanford 20/20 competition (where matches held full Twenty20 status), playing a single game against Grenada. In the 2006–07 KFC Cup, Francis appeared in four of his team's seven matches, including the semi-final and final. His best performance came in the first match, when he scored 36 against Trinidad and Tobago. In between, he made a second first-class appearance, against the Leeward Islands.

References

External links
Player profile and statistics at CricketArchive
Player profile and statistics at ESPNcricinfo

1985 births
Living people
Dominica cricketers
Windward Islands cricketers